Ptichodis ovalis is a moth of the family Erebidae. It is found in Mexico (Oaxaca) and the United States, where it has been recorded from Arizona, New Mexico and Texas.

The wingspan is 28–33 mm. Adults have been recorded on wing from May to August.

References

Moths described in 1883
Ptichodis